Nathaniel Grogan (the Elder) (1740–1807) was an Irish painter from Cork.

Career
Grogan was originally an apprentice to his father, a turner and block maker, but he had a love for the arts and taught himself to draw. He trained in Cork under the local painter John Butts, and was influenced by Dutch painters such as Hobbema and Heemskerck. At his father's request, he enlisted in the British army and served in America during the War of Independence. Little is known of the paintings he produced in the New World. He went on to produce numerous oil and watercolour paintings depicting landscapes and genre scenes of his native Cork. His son also achieved some success as a painter.

View of Cork, in the collection of the city's Crawford Art Gallery, was previously believed to be by Grogan, and is now attributed to his teacher, John Butts.

References

External links
Grogan at the Crawford Art Gallery

1740 births
1807 deaths
British Army personnel of the American Revolutionary War
People from County Cork
18th-century Irish painters
19th-century Irish painters
Irish male painters
19th-century Irish male artists